"" (English: "Chant of Liberty") is the national anthem of Cape Verde. It was made official in 1996, replacing "Esta É a Nossa Pátria Bem Amada", which was also the national anthem of Guinea Bissau, a legacy of both countries' joint independence. The music was composed by Adalberto Higino Tavares Silva (1961–), and the lyrics were written by Amílcar Spencer Lopes (1948–).

The national anthem must be played at the beginning and end of all public events in which the head of state is present and also when national parties and openings and closings of radio and television broadcasts are held.

Lyrics

Notes

References

External links
Audio of Cântico da Liberdade, national anthem of Cape Verde, with information and lyrics

African anthems
National symbols of Cape Verde
Portuguese-language songs
National anthem compositions in C-sharp major
National anthem compositions in E-flat major